Tower East is a high-rise office building in Shaker Heights, Ohio. At , it is the tallest building in the city. Tower East was the last building in the United States designed by architect Walter Gropius. Gropius designed this building during his tenure with The Architect's Collaborative (TAC). 

BGK Equities of Santa Fe, New Mexico, purchased the building for $12.68 million in 2000. In 2015, it was sold to E2G, an affiliate of the Equity Engineering Group, Inc.

The building was added to the National Register of Historic Places in 2014.

References

External links

Modernist architecture in Ohio
Shaker Heights, Ohio
Skyscrapers in Ohio
Walter Gropius buildings
Buildings and structures in Cuyahoga County, Ohio
National Register of Historic Places in Cuyahoga County, Ohio
Commercial buildings on the National Register of Historic Places in Ohio
Skyscraper office buildings in Ohio
Office buildings completed in 1969
1969 establishments in Ohio